Radek Haas (born February 5, 2000) is a Czech professional ice hockey goaltender. He is currently playing for HC Slovan Ústí nad Labem of the Chance Liga on loan from BK Mladá Boleslav.

Haas was an academy player at Mladá Boleslav from 2013 to 2017 before moving to Finland to join Ässät's academy. He went on to play three games for Ässät's senior team during the 2018–19 Liiga season. On October 19, 2019, Haas returned to Mladá Boleslav and played two games for the team during the 2019–20 season. He also had loan spells with HC Stadion Litoměřice, HC Baník Sokolov and LHK Jestřábi Prostějov during the season.

On July 20, 2020, Haas went sent out on loan to HC Slovan Ústí nad Labem.

References

External links

2000 births
Living people
Ässät players
HC Baník Sokolov players
Czech ice hockey goaltenders
LHK Jestřábi Prostějov players
BK Mladá Boleslav players
HC Slovan Ústečtí Lvi players
Sportspeople from Karlovy Vary
HC Stadion Litoměřice players
Czech expatriate ice hockey players in Finland